Sarez Lake is a lake in Rushon District of Gorno-Badakhshan province, Tajikistan.

The lake formed in 1911, after a great earthquake, when the Murghab River was blocked by a big landslide. Scientists believe that the landslide dam formed by the earthquake, known as the Usoi Dam, is unstable given local seismicity, and that the terrain below the lake is in danger of catastrophic flood if the dam were to fail during a future earthquake. The Usoi Dam wall survived a localised 7.2 magnitude earthquake, the 2015 Tajikistan earthquake, on the 7th December 2015 with no visible signs of deterioration.

Shadau Lake is a small water body southwest of the Usoi Dam and west of Sarez Lake.

Formation
The formation of Sarez Lake is described in the book by Middleton and Thomas:

References

External links
Map of the Usoi Dam - Sarez Lake, Scale 1:110'000
NASA Earth Observatory photo
Sarez Risk Mitigation Project
Sarez lake, Rogun HPP, Aral sea ...

Lakes of Tajikistan
Gorno-Badakhshan Autonomous Region
Landslide-dammed lakes
Landslides in Tajikistan
Landslides in 1911